How We Are was the second EP by Bombay Bicycle Club, released in 2007. It was released to download, on CD and as a limited edition 7" vinyl.

Release
The band self-released the EP on their own label, Mmm... Records. It reached #2 in the UK Indie Charts, with the Super Furry Animals single "Run-Away" at #1.

Track listing

References

External links
Bombay Bicycle Club official website

2007 EPs
Bombay Bicycle Club albums